Shane Carthy is a Gaelic footballer who plays for Naomh Mearnóg CLG and for the Dublin county team. He was a member of the Dublin squad that won the 2016 All-Ireland Senior Football Championship and the 2016 National Football League.

In January 2021, he discussed his mental health and how he confided in his manager on The Late Late Show.

Honours
All-Ireland Senior Football Championship (1): 2013
Leinster Senior Football Championship (1): 2013
All-Ireland Under-21 Football Championship (1): 2014
Leinster Under-21 Football Championship (1): 2014
All-Ireland Minor Football Championship (1): 2012

References

1991 births
Living people
Donegal Boston Gaelic footballers
DCU Gaelic footballers
Dublin inter-county Gaelic footballers
St Vincents (Dublin) Gaelic footballers